Luiz Antônio Venker de Menezes (born 11 June 1962), known as Mano Menezes, is a Brazilian professional football coach and former player. He is the current head coach of Internacional.

He managed the Brazil national team from July 2010 until his sacking on November 2012. His nickname comes from his early childhood, when his sister used to call him "Mano", which is a popular slang term meaning "brother" in Portuguese.

He was born in Passo do Sobrado, Rio Grande do Sul, and began his footballing career as a defender for Guarani de Venâncio Aires in the late 1970s and early 1980s. He gave up playing to become a physical education professional, beginning in 1986 in Rio Grande do Sul, before going on to Guarani de Venâncio Aires, Juventude and Internacional (as well as a spell in 1997 with Paulo Autuori at Cruzeiro).

Early life and career
Menezes was the coach of Grêmio from 2005 through 2007. He led them to promotion in 2005 and followed that up with a third-place finish in the 2006 Série A. In 2007, he led Grêmio to the final of the Copa Libertadores. At the end of the 2007 season, he took over as coach of Corinthians and started the 2008 season with a 3–0 win over Guarani. Menezes led Corinthians to the 2008 Série B title with 25 wins, 10 draws and three losses, finishing with 85 points.

Coaching career

15 de Novembro
Mano's biggest highlight during his coaching time at 15 de Novembro was during 2004 Copa do Brasil. As the trainer of the team, who has never even won the Rio Grande do Sul state championship, he made to the semifinals, beating more traditional clubs such as four-time Campeonato Brasileiro Série A champion Vasco da Gama.

Grêmio
In April 2005, Menezes was hired as coach by Grêmio to be responsible for bringing back the team to the Campeonato Brasileiro Série A, which he achieved and also won the Campeonato Brasileiro Série B championship title that year in a match that became known as "The Battle of the Afflicted (Batalha dos Aflitos)", due to events that took place along the departure and the fact that this has been held in the stadium Aflitos, Náutico's stadium in Recife, Pernambuco. This episode later became a movie named Batalha dos Aflitos, released in 2007.

In 2006, he led Grêmio when they took the win in the Campeonato Gaúcho with a victory over arch-rival Internacional, the first time Grêmio had won since 2001. Also in 2006, Grêmio ranked in third in the Série A, thereby earning a place in the 2007 Copa Libertadores. In 2007 they won the Campeonato Gaúcho again and reached the final in Copa Libertadores, where they lost to Boca Juniors.

Menezes left Grêmio after 169 games, with 89 wins, 35 draws and 45 losses, a win rate of 59.56%; 302 points were earned from a total of 507. The last game played by Grêmio with him as coach was the last game of the season's Série A, on 28 November 2007, against Corinthians, the team he was to coach next. In losing that match, the Corinthians were relegated to Série B.

Corinthians

Menezes was hired to manage the Corinthians at the end of 2007, and to raise them back up from relegation. In 2008, Corinthians played the Copa do Brasil, losing to Sport Club do Recife. That year they also took the title of Campeonato Brasileiro Série B 2008.

In May 2009, Menezes led Corinthians to become unbeaten champions of the Campeonato Paulista. On 1 July 2009, Corinthians won the Copa do Brasil against Internacional. With the win, Corinthians gained entry to the 2010 Copa Libertadores.

Brazil
On 24 July 2010, the Brazilian Football Confederation (CBF) announced that Mano would replace Dunga as manager of the Brazil national team. He was not the CBF's first choice, but Fluminense had refused to release Muricy Ramalho the day before. Menezes' appointment was generally well received, although some pointed out that his favoured playing style resembled Dunga's defensive style. He coached his first Brazil match on 10 August 2010, a 2–0 win against the United States. For this match, he selected many young players, including Diego Tardelli, André and David Luiz, among others. In addition, Menezes selected only four players that had participated in the 2010 FIFA World Cup in South Africa: Dani Alves, Ramires, Thiago Silva and Robinho, as well as 2010 World Cup cuts Alexandre Pato, Marcelo and Neymar.

At the 2011 Copa América, Brazil went out in the quarter-finals on penalties to Paraguay after a 0–0 draw, with Brazil missing all the four of its penalties. He was also the coach of the Olympic team at London 2012, hoping to win the long-awaited gold medal for Brazil, the only accolade Brazil had not won in football, however they were defeated by Mexico in the final and Menezes was the target of criticism in Brazil.

Following disappointing results, Menezes was sacked on 23 November 2012.

Flamengo
In June 2013, Menezes was named as the new coach of Brazilian club Flamengo.

Corinthians
In 2014, Menezes returned to Corinthians. After helping Corinthians to a fourth-place league finish, as well as qualifying for the Copa Libertadores, on 6 December 2014 Menezes resigned as head coach of the club.

Shandong Luneng
In December 2015, Shandong Luneng Taishan of the Chinese Super League announced that Menezes would be the new coach of the team.

On 21 April 2016, with a 1–0 victory over Japanese side Sanfrecce Hiroshima, Shandong Luneng returned to the knockout stage of the Asian Champions League after an 11-year absence, with one round of the group stage in advance. On 25 May, Shandong Luneng defeated Sydney FC, entering the quarter-finals of the AFC Champions League, which was the best result for the team in ACL. In contrast to the excellent performance in continental competition, Shandong fell into the relegation zone in domestic league. On 7 Jun 2016, Shandong Luneng Taishan announced that Mano had resigned for personal reasons and he was no longer the manager of the team. He was replaced by former FC Bayern Munich and VfL Wolfsburg manager Felix Magath.

Cruzeiro
After the fiasco in China, Mano returned to Cruzeiro in order to repeat the campaign of the Brasileirão 2015, when freed from relegation.

Bahia
On 8 September 2020, Mano was named head coach of Bahia in the top tier, agreeing to a contract until the end of 2021.  On 20 December, after a 3–4 away loss against Flamengo, he was sacked.

Al Nassr
On 9 April 2021, he was appointed as the manager of Saudi club Al Nassr. On 19 September 2021, he was sacked after a 1–3 loss against Ittihad.

Internacional
On 19 April 2022, Mano was appointed head coach of Internacional back in his home country.

Statistics

Managerial

Honors
Grêmio
Campeonato Brasileiro Série B: 2005
Campeonato Gaúcho: 2006, 2007

Corinthians
Campeonato Brasileiro Série B: 2008
Campeonato Paulista: 2009
Copa do Brasil: 2009

Cruzeiro
Copa do Brasil: 2017, 2018
Campeonato Mineiro: 2018, 2019

Brazil
Superclásico de las Américas: 2011 and 2012

See also
 List of Brazil national football team managers

References

Sportspeople from Rio Grande do Sul
Living people
1962 births
Brazilian football managers
Expatriate football managers in China
2011 Copa América managers
Campeonato Brasileiro Série A managers
Campeonato Brasileiro Série B managers
Chinese Super League managers
Esporte Clube Guarani managers
Grêmio Esportivo Brasil managers
Iraty Sport Club managers
Clube 15 de Novembro managers
Sociedade Esportiva e Recreativa Caxias do Sul managers
Grêmio Foot-Ball Porto Alegrense managers
Sport Club Corinthians Paulista managers
Brazil national football team managers
CR Flamengo managers
Cruzeiro Esporte Clube managers
Shandong Taishan F.C. managers
Sociedade Esportiva Palmeiras managers
Esporte Clube Bahia managers
Al Nassr FC managers
Sport Club Internacional managers
Brazilian expatriate sportspeople in Saudi Arabia
Saudi Professional League managers
Expatriate football managers in Saudi Arabia
Brazilian expatriate football managers
Brazilian expatriate sportspeople in China